The 1991 Jade Solid Gold Best Ten Music Awards Presentation was held in January 1992. It is part of the Jade Solid Gold Best Ten Music Awards Presentation series held in Hong Kong.

Top 10 song awards 
The top 10 songs (十大勁歌金曲) of 1991 are as follows.

Additional awards

References 
 Top ten songs award 1991, Tvcity.tvb.com
 Additional awards 1991, Tvcity.tvb.com

Cantopop
Jade Solid Gold Best Ten Music Awards Presentation, 1991
Jade Solid Gold Best Ten Music Awards